Mairis Briedis  (born 13 January 1985) is a Latvian professional boxer. He is a three-time cruiserweight world champion, having held the IBF and Ring titles from 2020 to 2022; the WBC title from 2017 to 2018; and the WBO title in 2019. Upon winning the WBC title in 2017, he became the first Latvian to hold a world boxing title. He was awarded the Order of the Three Stars in 2017. As a professional, he has fought world champions Oleksander Usyk, Marco Huck, Krzysztof Głowacki, Manuel Charr, and Yuniel Dorticos. As of November 2022, he is ranked as the world's third best active cruiserweight by The Ring magazine, BoxRec, and second by the Transnational Boxing Rankings Board.

Professional career

Early career 
At the age of 24, after previously serving as a Latvian State Police officer in Rīga, Briedis turned professional in 2009. He racked up multiple wins in his home country and abroad, including a second-round technical knockout (TKO) of former heavyweight title challenger Danny Williams. He captured the IBA cruiserweight title along the way. Briedis' first fight of note came in 2015, when he moved up in weight and traveled to Russia to face former heavyweight title challenger Manuel Charr. Briedis knocked out his much bigger opponent with a single punch in the fifth round. In 2016, Briedis knocked out hard-hitting Nigerian Olanrewaju Durodola in a slug fest, to capture the WBC Silver cruiserweight title. This made him the mandatory challenger for the winner of Tony Bellew and Ilunga Makabu. Briedis was ringside for the fight and congratulated the victorious Bellew in his dressing room afterwards. Briedis then fought in the UK for the first time in a stay busy fight against Simon Vallily on the undercard of Bellew's first title defence against BJ Flores. Bellew vacated his title in early 2017, meaning the vacant title would be on the line in Briedis' next fight.

Briedis vs. Huck 
Due to Tony Bellew fighting David Haye instead of taking on Briedis, the WBC ordered a match for the WBC interim cruiserweight title between Marco Huck and Briedis. The winner would earn a fight with Bellew for the full WBC title or possibly be elevated to full championship status if Bellew decided to vacate and stay at heavyweight. As Bellew didn't plan to defend his title for a while, he vacated the title in March 2017. On 1 April 2017 Briedis captured the vacant WBC cruiserweight title by defeating Huck via unanimous decision (UD) (118–109, 117–110, 116–111). Huck was deducted a point after an accidental clash of heads. Briedis was able to outbox the former two-time champion and prevent him from having any success on the inside during the fight. Some boxing pundits had Briedis winning every round in the fight. The IBO title, previously held by Huck, became vacant due to Briedis not paying the sanctioning fees.

2017–18: World Boxing Super Series 

On 2 June 2017 Briedis announced that he would take part in the inaugural World Boxing Super Series (WBSS), where the winner would receive a grand prize as well as the Muhammad Ali Trophy. Briedis described the bracket style tournament as the 'Champions League of boxing'.

Briedis vs. Perez 
At the Draft Gala, which took place on 8 July in Monte Carlo, Briedis chose former heavyweight contender Mike Perez (22–2–1, 14 KOs) as his quarter-final opponent. Perez had been out of action for 25 months before moving down to the 200 pound limit division and won his first fight at that weight with a first-round knockout on 10 June 2017. On 22 July, the WBSS announced the fight would take place in Briedis' home country of Latvia at the Rīga Arēna in Riga on 30 September 2017. This was the eighth time Briedis fought at the arena. Briedis defeated Perez by UD over twelve rounds (116–110, 115–111, 114–112). Perez was deducted a point in round three following an accidental clash of heads. Briedis was also docked a point during round ten for excessive holding. With the win, Briedis moved on to the semi-finals to face top-seeded Oleksandr Usyk.

Briedis vs. Usyk 
Briedis had the next fight against Usyk (13–0, 11 KOs), following the latter's win over Marco Huck. In November 2017, it was reported the fight would take place on 27 January 2018 in Riga, Latvia, a week before Gassiev vs. Dorticos would take place. Arēna Rīga was confirmed as the location by Comosa's Chief Boxing Officer Kalle Sauerland. Usyk came in at 199.5 pounds and Briedis weighed 199.1 pounds. Usyk moved on to the final of the tournament after defeating Briedis via majority decision (MD). With a high work rate, Usyk controlled most of the fight with his jab, putting on pressure when needed. Briedis was credited with landing the harder punches. The opening four rounds where closely contested and Usyk was cut from a head-butt over his right eye in round three. From round five, Usyk became busier and took control of the fight, although he was still hit with some hard shots to the head from Briedis. One judge scored the fight 114–114, whilst the remaining two judges scored the fight 115–113 in favour of Usyk. After the fight, Usyk stated it was the hardest fight of his career. According to CompuBox stats, Usyk landed 212 of 848 punches thrown (25%) and Briedis was more accurate, landing 195 of his 579 thrown (33.7%). Usyk landed 40% of his power punches. Many boxers and pundits praised the fight.

Reserve fight 
On 28 June 2018, Briedis began training for his next bout, which was speculated to take place on the undercard of the WBSS final on 21 July at the Olympic Stadium in Moscow. His opponent was later announced to be French boxer Brandon Deslaurier (11–1–1, 1 KO). Briedis was also confirmed as the WBSS final substitute in case either Usyk or Murat Gassiev could not compete. The bout with Deslaurier was scheduled for ten rounds. Briedis went the ten round distance, defeating Deslaurier via UD. All three judges scored the fight 100–90.

2018–19: World Boxing Super Series 
In August 2018, Briedis, along with Yuniel Dorticos, entered a second edition of the WBSS. Unlike the inaugural tournament, there was no world champions, as Usyk had unified all the titles. Mateusz Masternak, Krzysztof Głowacki and Maxim Vlasov were other top contenders to join.

Briedis vs. Gevor 
As the #1 seed, Briedis chose to fight German boxer Noel Gevor (23–1, 10 KOs). Gevor was ranked at #14 by the WBC. On 26 September, it was announced that the Briedis vs. Gevor bout, along with the Głowacki vs. Vlasov would take place as a doubleheader on 10 November at the UIC Pavilion in Chicago, US.

Briedis vs. Głowacki 
On 15 June 2019 Briedis won the WBO cruiserweight title in a controversial fight against Głowacki (31–1, 19 KOs). Briedis won by TKO in the third round but appeared to intentionally foul his opponent with an elbow strike after being hit on the back of the neck in the second. The WBO's report on the fight also stated that the referee Robert Byrd made "multiple errors" in officiating the fight and ordered a rematch. Briedis was later stripped of the title after refusing to defend it in a direct rematch fight with Głowacki rather than proceeding with the WBSS tournament Final.

Briedis vs. Dorticos 
Briedis was scheduled to face Yuniel Dorticos on 26 September 2020 at the Plazamedia Broadcasting Center in Munich, Germany, for the WBSS tournament final. Mairis Briedis beat Yuniel Dorticos by majority decision in their 12-round contest on Saturday 26 September 2020 at Plazamedia Broadcasting Center in Munich. The scorecards were announced as 111-117, 114-114, 111-117 in favor of winner Mairis Briedis. The fight took place over rounds in the Cruiserweight division, which meant the weight limit was 200 pounds (14.3 stone or 90.7 KG). This was the final of the World Boxing Super Series. This was a unique fight as there were almost no spectators because of the corona virus precaution in the EU.

Briedis vs. Mann 
Briedis was booked to defend his IBF and The Ring cruiserweight titles against the former WBO International titlist and one-time IBO Cruiserweight title challenger Artur Mann. The bout was scheduled for 16 October 2021, at the Arena Riga in Riga, Latvia. Briedis made quick work of his opponent, beating him by technical knockout near the end of the third round. The stoppage was preceded by two knockdowns, one coming with 10 seconds left in the second round, while the second came 39 seconds before the knockout itself. Briedis called out the reigning WBO cruiserweight champion Lawrence Okolie in his post-fight interview, stating: "Eddie Hearn, give Okolie the money, and we’ll make the fight. If this happens, it will be a mega fight in the UK".

Briedis vs. Opetaia 
Briedis was scheduled to make his second IBF and The Ring title defense against the undefeated mandatory title challenger Jai Opetaia on 6 April 2022, at the TBD venue in Australia. The bout was postponed on February 16, as Briedis tested positive for COVID-19. The bout was rescheduled for 11 May, and was expected to take place at the Gold Coast Convention and Exhibition Centre in Broadbeach, Queensland, Australia. The bout was once again postponed on April 8, as Opetaia suffered a rib injury, and rescheduled for July 2. Briedis lost the fight by unanimous decision, with scores of 116–112, 116–112 and 115–113. He had a late surge in the fight, during which he managed to break Opetaia's jaw, but was unable to win enough rounds on the judges' scorecards.

Professional boxing record

See also
List of IBF world champions
List of world cruiserweight boxing champions

References

External links
 
Mairis Briedis - Profile, News Archive & Current Rankings at Box.Live

1985 births
Living people
Latvian male kickboxers
Place of birth missing (living people)
Latvian male boxers
Cruiserweight boxers
World cruiserweight boxing champions
World Boxing Council champions
International Boxing Organization champions
Sportspeople from Riga
Latvian police officers